Elizabeth Adkins, who was also known as Moll King, Moll Bird, Mary Godson, Mary and Maria Godson (1696–1747), was a prominent figure in London's underworld during the early 18th century. She owned King's Coffeehouse with her husband Tom King and she also allegedly worked in the sex trade and as a pickpocket.

Adkins has been connected in historical analysis to a London criminal named Moll King, and court documents suggest Moll King was born at least twenty years before.

Biography
According to a pamphlet published anonymously in 1747, Adkins was born in 1696 in Vine Street, London. The Life and Character of Moll King states that Adkins' father was a shoemaker and that her mother sold fish, fruit and greens in the street. It also suggests Adkins became a prostitute before the age of fourteen.

Adkins was married to a man named Thomas King, known around the area as Smooth'd-Fac'd-Tom, at fourteen, and was linked several years later to William Murray. When this second relationship ended, Adkins befriended a famous courtesan Sally Salisbury and began her own work in the sex trade. During this time, between 1715 and 1720, Adkins began using her aliases, Mary or Maria Godson.

Adkins returned to her husband King, and the two began a business selling nuts on the street.  By 1717, the nut stand had grown into the storefront eventually called King's Coffeehouse in about 1717. Guests at the coffeehouse included many of London's most famous sex workers, including Mother Needham and Mother Whyburn. Adkins was thought to be the driving force behind the coffee house, and also became a money-lender.

Although never a brothel as such, the coffee house was a meeting place for pimps, prostitutes and their clients. To avoid prosecution for keeping a brothel, there were no beds on the premises. King and her clientele spoke in a slang called "flash talk" to try and confuse any eavesdroppers to the conversations. Tom and Moll King were arrested in 1737 for keeping a disorderly house and fined.

The Kings bought a parcel of land at Haverstock Hill and built a 'genteel villa' and three substantial houses. The villa became known as 'Molly King's Folly, and was occupied by King's protege Nancy Dawson. King was known in the area as the "Little Princess".

Adkins' husband, King, died in 1739, allegedly of complications due to his alcoholism. After her husband's death King continued to run the coffee house by herself. Her tolerant attitude frequently gave way to rages and she earned a new nickname, "The Virago". Adkins increasingly showed drunken behaviour which landed her in court frequently. However she was adept at playing the system and sometimes manipulated her court appearances to be transferred to the Court of King's Bench. The prosecution did not pursue the charges due to the much greater expense of King's Bench hearings. After refusing to pay a £200 fine for keeping a disorderly house, King was imprisoned. King remarried to a Mr Hoff.

King retired in about 1745, and following a long illness, died on 17 September 1747, in her country house at Haverstock Hill. Adkins left her money to her son, who was described as a "very hopeful young fellow and on whom she bestowed a liberal education at Eton School".

References

Bibliography
 
 
 
 
 
 
 
 
 
 
 

1696 births
1747 deaths
English criminals
18th-century English businesswomen
English female prostitutes
1718 crimes in Europe
Criminals from London
18th-century English businesspeople
18th century in London